Ruth Elias (née Huppert; 6 October 1922 – 11 October 2008) was a Jewish woman who was born Ruth Huppert in Moravian Ostrava on 6 October 1922.  After the German annexation of Czechoslovakia, she was sent to the Theresienstadt ghetto and then Auschwitz concentration camp where she survived experimentation by Dr. Mengele.  She subsequently went to Israel where she wrote a memoir, Triumph of Hope. She died on 11 October 2008 at age 86.

Documentaries
 Heike Tauch: "Wann reden, wann schweigen. Ein Besuch bei Ruth und Kurt Elias in Beth Jitzchak" Deutschlandfunk 2007, 50 min
 Claude Lanzmann: Shoah: Four Sisters

References

Further reading
 

1922 births
2008 deaths
Auschwitz concentration camp survivors
Czechoslovak emigrants to Israel
Czechoslovak Jews
20th-century Israeli Jews
Jewish women writers
Theresienstadt Ghetto survivors